The following are events related to Canadian soccer in the year 2022.

National teams

Men’s

Senior

Friendlies

World Cup Qualification

CONCACAF Third round

CONCACAF Nations League

Group C

2022 FIFA World Cup 

The final draw was held at the Doha Exhibition and Convention Center in Doha, Qatar, on 1 April 2022, 19:00 AST, prior to the completion of qualification.

Group F

U-20

Friendlies

CONCACAF U-20 Championship

Group E

Knockout stage

U-17

Copa México de Naciones Sub-17

Women’s

Senior 

.

Friendlies

CONCACAF W Championship

Group B

Knockout stage

Final

Arnold Clark Cup

U-20 

.

CONCACAF Women's U-20 Championship 

The tournament is taking place from February 25 to March 12, 2022, in the Dominican Republic. Canada qualified directly to the group stage as one of the 16 highest-ranked entrants based on the Concacaf Women’s Under-20 Ranking.

Group G

Knockout stage

2022 FIFA U-20 Women's World Cup

Group C

U-17 

.

CONCACAF U-17 Championship

Group E

Knockout stage

FIFA U-17 Women's World Cup

Group D

Club competitions

Men’s

Domestic leagues

Canadian Premier League 

Eight teams play in the Canadian Premier League, all of which are based in Canada. It is considered a Division 1 men's league in the Canadian soccer league system.

Regular season

Playoffs 

Semifinal results

|}

Final

League1 Ontario (Men)

Première ligue de soccer du Québec (Men)

League1 British Columbia (Men)

Canadian Soccer League

Domestic cups

2020 Canadian Championship 

The 2020 Canadian Championship Final was delayed nearly two years due to the COVID-19 pandemic.

2022 Canadian Championship

Final

International leagues

Major League Soccer

Eastern Conference

Western Conference

MLS Next Pro 

Toronto FC II and Whitecaps FC 2 play in MLS Next Pro. It is considered a Division 3 men's league in the United States soccer league system.

Eastern Conference

Western Conference

USL League Two

International competitions

CONCACAF Champions League

Round of 16

|}

Quarter-finals

|}

CONCACAF League

Preliminary round

|}

Round of 16

|}

Leagues Cup 

Replaced with the Leagues Cup Showcase. No Canadian teams qualified.

Campeones Cup 

No Canadian teams qualified for the Campeones Cup.

Women’s

Domestic leagues

Interprovincial Championship

League1 Ontario (Women)

Première ligue de soccer du Québec (Women)

League1 British Columbia (Women)

International leagues

National Women's Soccer League 

No Canadian teams play in the National Women's Soccer League, though players from the Canada women's national soccer team are allocated to its teams by the Canadian Soccer Association.  It is considered a Division 1 women's league in the United States soccer league system.

United Women's Soccer 

Two Canadian teams (Calgary Foothills WFC and SASA Impact FC) play in the United Women's Soccer. It is considered a Division 2 women's league in the United States soccer league system.

References

External links 
 Canadian Soccer Association

2022 in Canadian soccer
Seasons in Canadian soccer
2022 sport-related lists